Augustino Eugenio Mercurio  (10 August 19287 December 2010) better known as Gus Mercurio, was an American-born Australian character actor who appeared in radio, television, and film.

Early life
Mercurio, the eldest child of Vincent A. Mercurio and Cecilia W. "Mickey" Miller, was born in West Bend, Wisconsin near Milwaukee. He had two sisters, Gerie and Connie, and a brother, Tony. His parents were divorced when he was seven.

He visited Australia during the 1956 Melbourne Olympics and decided to stay.

Early career
His father had boxed professionally under the name of Vince McGurk, and one of his uncles had boxed professionally under the name of Ray Miller. Mercurio himself was a professional boxer, had served in the United States Marine Corps and was also a chiropractor

Mercurio was also an international boxing judge (refereeing a world title fight) and was also a well-known boxing promoter.  He later became the inaugural president of the Australian National Boxing Hall of Fame – into which he was inducted in 2008.

Radio, TV and film
He was successful at his first audition for an ABC radio play. His raspy voice, energetic personality and natural talents quickly came to the attention of Australian television production houses such as Crawford Productions.

He also worked as a commentator for Channel 7's World of Sport, as well as acting as the movie host for Channel 10's Saturday Night with Gus Mercurio.

Mercurio appeared in several Australian TV series, including Cash and Company (1975), its follow-up Tandarra (1976) and the miniseries Power Without Glory (1976). Additionally, he played many guest roles in Australian TV police series, including Homicide (1964), Division 4 (1969) and Matlock Police (1971). His film appearances include The Blue Lagoon (1980), The Man from Snowy River (1982), Turkey Shoot (1982), Crocodile Dundee II (1988), Return to the Blue Lagoon (1991) and Doing Time for Patsy Cline (1997).

Family
Mercurio was married twice and fathered seven children, including dancer/actor Paul Mercurio, the star of the film Strictly Ballroom (1992).

Death
He died on 7 December 2010 from complications during surgery for a chest aneurysm. He was 82 years old.

Partial filmography

Alvin Purple Rides Again (1974) – Jake
Cash and Company (1975, TV Series) – Joe Brady
Power Without Glory (1976, TV Series) – Sparring Partner / Bill Tinns
The Sullivans (1976, TV Series) – George
Tandarra (1976, TV Series) – Joe Brady
Eliza Fraser (1976) – Darge
The Dreamers (1976)
Raw Deal (1977) – Ben
High Rolling (1977) – Nightclub Bouncer
Harlequin (1980) – Mr. Bergier
The Blue Lagoon (1980) – Officer
Dead Man's Float (1980) – Mr. Dobraski
Turkey Shoot (1982) – Red
The Man from Snowy River (1982) – Frew
All the Rivers Run (1983, TV Series) – Tom Critchley
The Return of Captain Invincible (1983) – Noisy Garbageman
Five Mile Creek (1983–1985, TV Series) – Ben Jones
I Live with Me Dad (1985) – Waldo Skrimm
The Challenge (1986, TV Series) – Vic Romagna
Running from the Guns (1987) – Chazza
Crocodile Dundee II (1988) – Frank
The Great Air Race (1990, TV Series) – 'Granny' Granville
Return to the Blue Lagoon (1991) – First Mate
Lightning Jack (1994) – Tough Guy
Flipper (1996–1999, TV Series) – Cap Daulton
Doing Time for Patsy Cline (1997) – Tyrone
Dalkeith (2002) – Enzo Petroni

Works 
 Mercurio, G., Boxin' : all you wanted to know but didn't want to fight to ask, Regus, (Kew), 1998. 
 Mercurio, G., Hang in There: Inspirational Gems to Empower You!, Wilkinson Books, (Melbourne), 1994.

References

External links
 
 Gus Mercurio biography at Aussie Box
 Photo Gallery: Farewell Gus Mercurio
 New Colonial Epic, Sydney Morning Herald TV Guide, Monday, 2 February 1976.
 Carman, G. & Upham, P., "Thinking man's boxer and more", The Age, 9 December 2010.
 Humphries, R. "Inside Sport: Gus Mercurio", Sydney Morning Herald, Wednesday, 25 February 1976, p.25.
 Paxinos, S., "A Contest in Black and White", The Age, 18 May 2008.
 Paxinos, S., "One out of the box", The Age, 12 July 2005.
 Quinn, K., "Farewell to a man who made mistakes … and amends", The Age, 21 December 2010.
  Stark, J., "Boxing history hits the canvas", The Age,29 September 2005.
 Silvers, A.R., "Wisconsin's Mercurio was a famous actor in Australia", The Journal Sentinel, 11 December 2010.
 Webb, C., "Celebrating dinky-di Americans", The Age, 7 June 2005.

1928 births
2010 deaths
American male film actors
Australian male film actors
Australian male soap opera actors
American emigrants to Australia
American people of Italian descent
Male actors from Milwaukee
United States Marines
Australian male boxers
Boxers from Melbourne
Boxing judges
Australian boxing promoters
Recipients of the Medal of the Order of Australia
Naturalised citizens of Australia
Australian people of Italian descent
People from West Bend, Wisconsin